The 2020 New Mexico Lobos football team represented the University of New Mexico in the 2020 NCAA Division I FBS football season. The Lobos played their home games at Sam Boyd Stadium as members of the Mountain West Conference due to COVID-19 restrictions imposed by the state of New Mexico. They were led by first-year head coach Danny Gonzales.

On August 10, 2020, the Mountain West Conference suspended all sports competitions due to the COVID-19 pandemic. On September 24, the conference announced that the football season would begin on October 24.

Previous season
The Lobos finished the 2019 season 2–10 and 0–8 in Mountain West play to finish in last place in the Mountain Division and did not qualify for a bowl game. Head coach Bob Davie was replaced by Danny Gonzales.

Preseason

Award watch lists

Mountain West media days
The Mountain West media days were originally scheduled on July 16–17, 2020, at SoFi Stadium in Inglewood, California, but were canceled in favor of virtual media days due to the COVID-19 pandemic. The virtual media days that were scheduled to take place on July 27–29, 2020, were also canceled.

Media poll
The preseason poll was released on July 21, 2020. The Lobos were predicted to finish in sixth place in the MW Mountain Division. The divisions were later suspended for the 2020 season.

Schedule
New Mexico announced its 2020 football schedule on February 26, 2020. The Lobos' original schedule consisted of six home and seven away games in the regular season. On August 10, 2020, the Mountain West Conference announced the suspension of the football season due to the COVID-19 pandemic. In late September, the Mountain West Conference announced that the season would begin on October 24.

Original

Revised

Personnel

Depth chart

Game summaries

at Colorado State (No Contest)

The New Mexico at Colorado State game was canceled by the Mountain West, due to COVID-19 restrictions and the game was not rescheduled.

at San Jose State

at Hawaii

Nevada

at Air Force

at Utah State

Wyoming

Fresno State

Notes

References

New Mexico
New Mexico Lobos football seasons
New Mexico Lobos football